Galesburg is an unincorporated community in Jasper County, in the U.S. state of Iowa. Galesburg lies along the junction of Main Street/Sioux Avenue and Highway T14 S.

History
Galesburg was platted on Section 16 of Elk Creek Township. In 1878 it was described as "a little village" with a large store and a recently completed railroad. 

The Galesburg post office opened in 1857 (originally under the name Galesburgh) and closed in 1904.

The population of Galesburg was 160 in 1887, and was 88 in 1902. The population was 89 in 1917.

References

Unincorporated communities in Jasper County, Iowa
Unincorporated communities in Iowa